SAS Charlotte Maxeke (S102) is a , a variant of the Type 209 diesel-electric attack submarine developed by Howaldtswerke-Deutsche Werft (HDW) of Germany, currently in service with the South African Navy. She is named after Charlotte Maxeke, a South African religious leader and political activist.

The sponsor of S102, Mrs. Mittah Seperepere named the submarine at a ceremony in Emden, Germany on 14 March 2007.

Background 
South Africa placed a contract for three Type 209/1400 submarines in July 2000 on Howaldtswerke-Deutsche Werft (HDW) and Thyssen Nordseewerke. The Heroine class are sometimes considered to be South Africa's first "true" submarines, as they were more suited to being underwater than the Daphné models.

Charlotte Maxeke arrived in Simon's Town on 7 April 2006.

As of 2021, Charlotte Maxeke was being refitted at the Armscor Dockyard. Funding in the amount of R189 million had reportedly been made available to ensure the completion of the refit during the 2023/24 financial year.

Deployments

 ATLASUR VIII - 2010 - exercises between the Brazilian, Argentinean, Uruguayan and South African defence forces.

External links 
 Global Security

References

Heroine-class submarines
Attack submarines
Submarines of South Africa
2005 ships
Military units and formations in Cape Town